Vladimirsky Uyezd (Владимирский уезд) was one of the subdivisions of the Vladimir Governorate of the Russian Empire. It was situated in the central part of the governorate. Its administrative centre was Vladimir.

Demographics
At the time of the Russian Empire Census of 1897, Vladimirsky Uyezd had a population of 160,996. Of these, 98.7% spoke Russian, 0.5% Polish, 0.3% Ukrainian, 0.3% Yiddish, 0.1% German, 0.1% Lithuanian and 0.1% Tatar as their native language.

References

 
Uezds of Vladimir Governorate
Vladimir Governorate